Chow Mei Kuan (born 23 December 1994) is a Malaysian retired badminton player. She started playing badminton at the age of 7 in her primary school. Chow made a debut in the international senior tournament in 2012. She won gold medals at the 2011 Commonwealth Youth Games in the girls' and mixed doubles event. Chow competed at the 2018 Commonwealth Games in Gold Coast and won the women's doubles event with Vivian Hoo Kah Mun.

Career 
Chow competed at the 2020 Tokyo Summer Olympics in the women's doubles partnering Lee Meng Yean, but the duo were eliminated in the group stage.

Chow gave her resignation letter to Badminton Association of Malaysia on 16 August 2021, and she will effectively left the team on 15 September 2021.

Achievements

Commonwealth Games 
Women's doubles

Southeast Asian Games 
Women's doubles

Summer Universiade 
Women's doubles

BWF World Junior Championships 
Girls' doubles

Mixed doubles

Asian Junior Championships 
Girls' doubles

BWF World Tour 
The BWF World Tour, which was announced on 19 March 2017 and implemented in 2018, is a series of elite badminton tournaments sanctioned by the Badminton World Federation (BWF). The BWF World Tour is divided into levels of World Tour Finals, Super 1000, Super 750, Super 500, Super 300 (part of the HSBC World Tour), and the BWF Tour Super 100.

Women's doubles

BWF International Challenge/Series 
Women's doubles

Mixed doubles

  BWF International Challenge tournament
  BWF International Series tournament
  BWF Future Series tournament

References

External links 
 
 

1994 births
Living people
Sportspeople from Kuala Lumpur
Malaysian sportspeople of Chinese descent
Malaysian female badminton players
Badminton players at the 2020 Summer Olympics
Olympic badminton players of Malaysia
Badminton players at the 2018 Commonwealth Games
Commonwealth Games gold medallists for Malaysia
Commonwealth Games silver medallists for Malaysia
Commonwealth Games medallists in badminton
Badminton players at the 2018 Asian Games
Asian Games competitors for Malaysia
Competitors at the 2017 Southeast Asian Games
Competitors at the 2019 Southeast Asian Games
Southeast Asian Games silver medalists for Malaysia
Southeast Asian Games bronze medalists for Malaysia
Southeast Asian Games medalists in badminton
Universiade bronze medalists for Malaysia
Universiade medalists in badminton
Medalists at the 2013 Summer Universiade
Medallists at the 2018 Commonwealth Games